Escaype Live is an 2022 Indian Hindi-language streaming television series created and directed by Siddharth Kumar Tewary. It is Written by Jaya Misra and Siddharth Kumar Tewary and has been dialogued by Vinod Sharma, Amol Surve and Ranveer Pratap Singh. Produced by Siddharth Kumar Tewary under the banner of One Life Studios. The series stars Siddharth, Jaaved Jaaferi, Shweta Tripathi, Sumedh Mudgalkar, Waluscha De Sousa, Plabita Borthakur and Ritvik Sahore. Escaype Live 9 episodes were launched on Disney+Hotstar in two instalments within a week of each other. Episode 1- 7 were dropped on 20 May 2022 and the finale two a week later thereby
successfully engaging their viewers and building curiosity over its content within the week.

Plot 
A live streaming app’s announced a contest promising instant fame and fortune to its most
popular participant turns mundane lives of 6 regular Indian’s upside down as their every reality
begins to change form. Escaype Live, is a social thriller series offering a
glimpse into the minds of people living in the world of social media and how far they’re willing to go
to get what they want. And how as the lines between the real and virtual begin to blur, the rules of
the game change and the order of morality transforms. When the stakes are high how far is a
person willing to go to achieve their dreams. And how much is really too much?

Cast 
 Siddharth as Krishna Rangaswamy
 Jaaved Jaaferi as Ravi Gupta
 Shweta Tripathi as Sunaina
 Waluscha De Sousa as Gia Bose
 Sumedh Mudgalkar as Dark Angel aka Darkie, Bablu in flash back
 Plabita Borthakur as Hina aka Fetish Girl
 Ritvik Sahore as Nilesh Sonawane aka Aamcha Spider
 Aadya Sharma as Rani Singh aka Dance Rani
 Rohit Chandel as Rajkumar aka Meena
 Swastika Mukherjee as Mala
 Alekh Sangal as Baldev
 Geetika Vidya Ohlyan as Sita
 Jagjeet Sandhu as Nandu
 Mallika Singh as Shrini Rangaswamy
 Aakanksha Singh as Devna
 Sharat Saxena as Rajkumar's Father
 Sanjay Narvekar as Aamcha's Father
 Smita Tambe as Aamcha's Mother
 Arundhati Nag as Laxmi Amma
 Anagh Jain as Dhruv
 Ashwin Mushran as Jogi Balla / Dhruv's Father
 Aditi Govitrikar as Meenal Bhalla / Dhruv's Mother
 Kunal Thakkar as Kunal (CTO)
 Khuman as Tashi

Series overview

Episodes

Release
The trailer of the series was released on 26 April 2022 consisting of seven episodes premiered on Disney+ Hotstar on 20 May 2022 and remaining two episodes were released on 27 May 2022.

References

External links
 
 Escaype Live on Disney+ Hotstar

Hindi-language television shows
2022 Indian television series debuts